This list includes music artists with at least five million record sales in Germany, based on certifications by the BVMI (Bundesverband Musikindustrie). Artists are ranked in descending order.

Awards are only presented if and when a record company applies for certification, it is not done automatically. Only records that were declared to and registered by the BVMI receive awards. The BVMI began its certifications in 1975, therefore popular artists from earlier eras are generally not represented on this list. This excludes artists such as Heintje Simons, Peter Alexander, Freddy Quinn, Caterina Valente, or the Rolling Stones, and may explain the lower-than-expected sales figures for pre-1975 artists like The Beatles. Certifications are based on a record's release date.

Video albums have been included since 1991 and streaming since 2016. Until 5 April 2018, a unit was equal to 1000 streams for albums and 100 streams for singles. Those numbers were raised to 2000 streams for albums and 200 streams for singles on 6 April of that year.

Artists by certified units

13 million records or more

11 to 12.9 million records

9 to 10.9 million records

7 to 8.9 million records

6 to 6.9 million records

5 to 5.9 million records

See also 

 List of best-selling albums in Germany
 List of best-selling singles in Germany

External links 

 BVMI website

References 

German music-related lists
German music industry